Bedros I may refer to:

Peter I of Armenia (died 1058), i.e. Bedros I Ketadarz, Catholicos of All Armenians in 1019–1058
Abraham Petros I Ardzivian (1679–1749), Patriarch Catholicos of Cilicia in 1740–1749